The Palace Hotel is a landmark historic hotel in San Francisco, California, located at the southwest corner of  Market and New Montgomery streets. The hotel is also referred to as the "new" Palace Hotel to distinguish it from the original 1875 Palace Hotel, which had been demolished after being gutted by the fire caused by the 1906 San Francisco earthquake.

The present structure opened on December 19, 1909, on the same site as its predecessor. The hotel was closed from January 1989 to April 1991 to undergo a two-year renovation and seismic retrofit. Occupying most of a city block, the hotel's now more than century-old nine-story main building stands immediately adjacent to both the BART Montgomery Street Station and the Monadnock Building, and across Market Street from Lotta's Fountain.

The Palace Hotel is a member of Historic Hotels of America, the official program of the National Trust for Historic Preservation.

The original Palace Hotel (1875–1906)

The original Palace Hotel was built by San Francisco banker and entrepreneur William Chapman Ralston, who heavily depended on his shaky banking empire to help finance the $5 million project. Although Ralston's Bank of California collapsed in late August 1875, and Ralston himself drowned in San Francisco Bay on the same day that he lost control of the institution, it did not interfere with the opening of the Palace Hotel two months later on October 2, 1875. Ralston's business partner in the project was U.S. Senator William Sharon, who had helped cause the collapse of the bank when he dumped his stock in the Comstock Lode. Sharon ended up in full control of the hotel as well as both the bank and Ralston's debts, both of which he paid off at just pennies on the dollar.

With 755 guest rooms, the original Palace Hotel (also known colloquially as the "Bonanza Inn") was at the time of its construction the largest hotel in the Western United States. At  in height, the hotel was San Francisco's tallest building for over a decade. The skylighted open center of the building featured a Grand Court overlooked by seven stories of white columned balconies which served as an elegant carriage entrance. Shortly after 1900 this area was converted into a lounge called the "Palm Court". The first chef was Jules Harder and the bartender, William "Cocktail" Boothby, was a fixture at the hotel for some years. The hotel featured large redwood-paneled hydraulic elevators which were known as "rising rooms". Each guest room or suite was equipped with a private bathroom as well as an electric call button to summon a member of the hotel's staff. All guest rooms could be joined together to create suites, or to make up large apartments for long-term residents, and the parlor of each guest room featured a large bay window overlooking the street below.

On November 25, 1890, Mōʻī  (King) David Kalakaua visited California aboard the U.S.S. Charleston with business between the Kingdom of Hawaii and the US Government. Kalakaua, whose health had been declining, stayed in a suite at the Palace Hotel. Traveling throughout Mexico and Southern California and reportedly drinking excessively, the monarch suffered a stroke in Santa Barbara and was rushed back to San Francisco. Kalakaua fell into a coma in his suite on January 18 and died two days later on January 20, 1891. The official cause of death as listed by US Navy officials was that the king had died from Bright's disease (inflammation of the kidneys).

Financed primarily by Bank of California co-founder William Ralston, it offered many innovative modern conveniences including an intercom system and four oversized hydraulic elevators  called lifting rooms. The most notable feature of the hotel was the Grand Court that served as an entry area for horse-drawn carriages. The area was converted to the palm filled "Garden Court" a few years before the 1906 earthquake.

"A palace truly! Where shall we find its equal? Windsor Hotel, good-bye! you must yield the palm to your great Western rival, as far as structure goes, though in all other respects you may keep the foremost place. There is no other hotel building in the world equal to this. The court of the Grand at Paris is poor compared to that of the Palace. Its general effect at night, when brilliantly lighted, is superb; its furniture, rooms and appointments are all fine, but then it tells you all over it was built to "whip all creation," and the millions of its lucky owner enabled him to triumph." .... Andrew Carnegie, Round the World Free guided tours of the hotel are led by volunteers of the San Francisco City Guides, a program of the San Francisco Public Library.

Although the hotel survived the initial damage from the early morning April 18, 1906, San Francisco earthquake, by late that afternoon it had been consumed by the subsequent fires. Notably, tenor Enrico Caruso (who had sung the role of Don José in Carmen the night before) was staying in the hotel at the time of the quake, and swore never to return to the city. The urban legend is Caruso, "stood in his nightshirt holding a personally  autographed photograph of President Theodore Roosevelt and demanded special treatment."

The "baby" Palace Hotel (1906–1907)

While the ruins of the original hotel were being razed and its permanent replacement built, a temporary 23-room facility known as the "Little" or "Baby" Palace Hotel was quickly designed and constructed about eight blocks west of the Market Street site at the NW corner of Post and Leavenworth Streets. A modest two-story frame structure, the "Baby" Palace was opened with considerable fanfare on November 17, 1906, just seven months after the earthquake and fire had devastated the city.

The hotel only remained open to the public until July 1907, however, when the Palace Hotel Company leased the nearby Fairmont Hotel on Nob Hill for ten years, and in turn leased the Post Street building to The Olympic Club for five years as a temporary clubhouse while that organization's facility was also being rebuilt. Within a decade of its construction, the building had already been replaced by a four-story brick apartment block built in 1916, which still occupies much of the northwest corner lot at Post and Leavenworth streets where the "Baby" Palace Hotel had briefly stood.<ref>[http://thepalacehotel.org/#BPH The "Baby" Palace Hotel 1906"] ThePalaceHotel.org</ref>

The "new" Palace Hotel (opened 1909)

Completely rebuilt from the ground up, the "New" Palace Hotel opened on December 19, 1909, and quickly resumed the role of its namesake predecessor as an important San Francisco landmark as well as host to many of the city's great events. While externally much plainer than the original Palace, the new "Bonanza Inn" is in many ways as elegant, sumptuous, and gracious on the inside as the 1875 building. The  (also called the "Palm Court")—which occupies the same area that the Grand Court did in the earlier structure—has been one of San Francisco's most prestigious hotel dining rooms since the day it opened.

Equally famous was the  located just off the gleaming polished marble , which was dominated by Maxfield Parrish's ,   of the same name.

The Ralston Room, named for co-founder William Ralston, is off the main lobby to the left of the painting.

The hotel served as the stage for several important events. In 1919, Woodrow Wilson gave speeches in the Garden Court in support of the Treaty of Versailles and the League of Nations.  In 1923, Warren G. Harding's term as President ended suddenly when he died at the Palace Hotel, in Room 8064, an eighth floor suite that overlooks Market Street. In 1945, the Palace Hotel hosted a banquet to mark the opening session of the United Nations.

The Palace was sold to Sheraton Hotels in 1954 and became the Sheraton-Palace Hotel. Soviet Premier Nikita Khrushchev spoke at a banquet at the Sheraton-Palace during his American tour in 1959. The Garden Court was declared a San Francisco Landmark in 1969. In 1973, not long after Sheraton was bought by ITT, it sold the Palace to the Japanese Kyo-Ya group, along with all of their hotels in the Hawaiian islands. Sheraton continued to manage the hotel and the name stayed the same. The entire structure of the Sheraton-Palace was declared a landmark in 1984.

The Sheraton-Palace Hotel closed on January 8, 1989 for a $150 million restoration that garnered national media attention and numerous awards. It reopened on April 3, 1991, as the Sheraton Palace Hotel, without the hyphen in its name. The Sheraton Palace was placed in The Luxury Collection division of ITT Sheraton when it was founded in 1992. The hotel dropped the Sheraton name in 1995, becoming again the Palace Hotel. In 1997, the finale of the David Fincher film The Game, starring Michael Douglas, was shot in the hotel's Garden Court.

A 60 story,  residential tower addition was proposed in 2006, to be named the Palace Hotel Residential Tower, designed by the architecture firm Skidmore, Owings & Merrill. Construction never began, due to the global financial crisis that hit in 2008.

The hotel's owners controversially removed the famed Pied Piper mural on March 23, 2013 for sale at a planned auction at Christie's. It was anticipated that the painting might sell for up to $5 million. In the light of strong public opposition to the painting's removal, however, the hotel's owners relented and instead had the painting cleaned, restored, and returned to the bar where it was rehung with considerable fanfare on August 22, 2013.

In 2015, the hotel underwent an extensive renovation designed by Beatrice Girelli of Indidesign to its guest rooms, indoor pool and fitness center, lobby, promenade, and The Garden Court, and also became part of the Marriott chain when Marriott acquired Starwood. In 2016, the Palace was named the Best Historic Hotel in the over 400 guest room category by Historic Hotels of America, an initiative of the U.S. National Trust for Historic Preservation.

In literature and popular culture
 The last chapter of the third part of the main story in the 2007 novel The Gravedigger's Daughter by American writer Joyce Carol Oates takes place at the Palace Hotel.
 In Time of Fog and Fire'' by writer Rhys Bowen, the protagonist, Molly Murphy Sullivan, travels to San Francisco and stays at the Palace Hotel while searching for her missing husband, days before the 1906 earthquake, describing the aftermath of the city's destruction and chaos.
 The cover photo of Nicolette Larson's 1978 Nicolette album shows the singer in the hotel's Garden Court restaurant.

Gallery

See also

List of San Francisco Designated Landmarks

References

External links

 
 ThePalaceHotel.org An online illustrated history of the Palace Hotel
 Guide to the Palace Hotel Records at The Bancroft Library
 Historical exhibits at the Palace Hotel

Hotels in San Francisco
South of Market, San Francisco
Market Street (San Francisco)
Hotel buildings completed in 1909
San Francisco Designated Landmarks
The Luxury Collection
Landmarks in San Francisco
Hotels established in 1875
1875 establishments in California
Buildings and structures burned in the 1906 San Francisco earthquake
1900s architecture in the United States
Beaux-Arts architecture in California
Burned hotels in the United States
Sheraton hotels
Historic Hotels of America